Tiers may refer to:

The plural of Tier
Ultra checkers, a variant of checkers
Tiers, South Tyrol, a municipality in Italy
Tiers, the French for triens or tremissis, coins of the Roman and Merovingian periods
World of Tiers, a series of science fiction novels by American writer Philip José Farmer